Sam Slade may refer to:
 Robo-Hunter, a British comic strip starring Sam Slade
 Sam Slade (politician), Canadian politician
 Sam Slade (rugby union), rugby union player

See also
 Samuel Slade, Church of England clergyman